Pío del Pilar (born Pío Isidro y Castañeda; July 11, 1860 – June 21, 1931) was a revolutionary general of the Philippines. To safeguard his family and prevent them from harassment, he changed his surname to del Pilar.

Early life and education
Del Pilar was born in Barrio Culi-culi (now Pio del Pilar), San Pedro de Macati (present-day Makati) on July 11, 1860 to Isaac del Pilar, a farmer from Pasay, and Antonia Castaňeda, an embroider from Mandaluyong. As a child, his parents had him study for two years in the school of Pascual Rodriguez, and for four months under Ramon Renaldo, until he was forced to stop to work in the family farm. Typical of other Filipinos at the time, del Pilar knew little or no Spanish, but was fluent in Tagalog.

Del Pilar married his childhood friend, Juliana Valeriano, at the age of 17. He was barely married for a year before he was drafted in the Spanish Army. He was assigned in Mindanao for a year, however his service was cut short to four months due to the intervention of a family friend.

In 1890, de Pilar was appointed cabeza de barangay and later on, became teniente del barrio in Makati. During this time, he had a chance meeting with Jose Rizal, and was inspired to distribute copies of his novel, Noli Me Tangere.

Role in Philippine Revolution
In May 1896, he joined the Katipunan and formed a chapter called Matagumpay (Triumphant), taking the symbolic name Pang-una. His chapter also adopted a flag, a white triangle with a K at each corner, at the hoist of a red field, in the center of which was a mountain with a rising sun on it. This flag was known as the Bandila ng Matagumpay (Flag of the Triumphant) and was del Pilar's personal standard during the revolution.

At the outbreak of the Philippine Revolution, del Pilar was arrested by Spanish authorities for suspected membership in the Katipunan. Although tortured, he did not reveal any secrets about the group until he was released. Del Pilar participated in his first battle in Mandaluyong on August 29, 1896. He also led a group of rebels in the Battle of Binakayan on November 9, 1896, capturing the town from Spanish authorities.

On February 16, 1897, bearing the rank of colonel, del Pilar defended Bacoor and Las Piñas. Subsequently, he was promoted to brigadier-general.

Del Pilar was present in the Tejeros Convention on March 22, 1897, which marked the split between the Magdiwang and Magdalo factions of the Katipunan. Because of the events of the Convention, he aligned himself with Bonifacio, eventually signing the Naic Military Agreement declaring the results of the convention to be null and void. In time, however, he switched sides, aligning himself with the Magdalo faction and becoming one of Emilio Aguinaldo's trusted generals. It was del Pilar (along with Gen. Mariano Noriel) that advised Aguinaldo to change the commutation (banishment) to execution of Andrés and Procopio Bonifacio.

His last battle was with the Americans, in the town of Morong. He fought bravely but he and his men were defeated and captured. Del Pilar was exiled to Guam along with Apolinario Mabini, Artemio Ricarte, and other patriot, termed Irreconcilables by the Americanss. He returned to the Philippines after Governor William Howard Taft extended pardons to the revolutionaries. He continued to fight for the cause of the Filipino people by supporting the Jones Bill for Filipinos' preparation for self governance.

He died on June 21, 1931 at the age of 70 due to lingering illness, almost three weeks shy of his 71st birthday.

In popular culture
 Portrayed by Ian Palma in the 2010 film, Ang Paglilitis ni Andres Bonifacio.
 Portrayed by Emilio Garcia in the 2012 film, El Presidente.

References

Filipino activists
Paramilitary Filipinos
People from Makati
1860 births
1931 deaths
Burials at the Manila North Cemetery
Members of the Malolos Congress
People of the Philippine Revolution